Beinn a' Bhathaich Àrd is mountain on the northern side of Glen Strathfarrar, in the Highlands of Scotland. It is situated at the eastern end of the glen, 5 km north-west of the village of Struy, and 16 km west of Beauly. Though not the highest hill in Strathfarrar, its position at the end of the glen makes it visible for some distance around. It is a prominent landmark from much of The Aird, Inverness and the Kessock Bridge.

Beinn a' Bhathaich Àrd is usually climbed from the hamlet of Inchmore, at the foot of Strathfarrar.

References

Corbetts
Marilyns of Scotland
Mountains and hills of the Northwest Highlands
Mountains and hills of Highland (council area)